Swinton is a village and civil parish in the Ryedale district of North Yorkshire, England. The village appears in the Domesday Book as 'Swintune' which is derived from 'pig farm'.

The parish had 467 residents at the 2001 census, which had risen to 608 by the time of the 2011 census. By 2015, North Yorkshire County Council had estimated the population to have been 630.

References

External links
Village website

Villages in North Yorkshire
Civil parishes in North Yorkshire